Woodhead of Fyvie, often simply called "Woodhead", is an inland hamlet in Formartine, Aberdeenshire, Scotland, that lies to the east of Fyvie near the upper River Ythan. It is believed to have been an ancient royal burgh, as evidenced by the 1723 record of a "stone tolbooth and a stone cross" and a 1765 map showing a large community and mercat cross, whilst Fyvie "was but a huddle of houses at Peterswell".

A house called Woodhead Tolbooth, dating to the 18th century, contains masonry reused from an earlier building.

All Saints' Episcopal Church (also known as Woodhead Chapel), 1849, was built by John Henderson. Its spire was added in 1870 by James Matthews. The manse, 1844, is also the work of Henderson.

Fetterletter Farm, of the late 18th century, contains within its grounds two disused, cylindrical thatched dovecotes.

References
Specific 

General
Woodhead in the Gazetteer for Scotland.

Bibliography

Villages in Aberdeenshire